Sidney Miller may refer to:

 Sid Miller (politician) (born 1955), Texas politician
 Sidney Miller (musician) (born 1980), American record producer and musician
 Sidney Miller (actor) (1916–2004), American actor, director and songwriter
 Sidney Miller (headmaster) (born 1943), author and headmaster
 Sidney Miller, character in Ah, Wilderness!, a 1935 American film adaptation of Eugene O'Neill's play of the same name